Move It! is the first album by the American electronic dance music project Reel 2 Real which had seven top 10 hits on the Hot Dance Music/Club Play chart in the 1990s.

Critical reception
AllMusic said, "Heard in clubs all over the world and still one of the most frequently licensed compilation tracks, Reel 2 Reel's "I Like to Move It," still sounds as hot today as it did when it first came out in 1993. The pulsing synths and sirens of the song made for an instant wall shaker. The mastermind of super DJ and remixer Erick Morillo, Move It combines the textures of Latin house music with a reggae vibe. Morillo is one of the world's bussiest and most sought-after DJs and remixers. Some of Move Its other standout tracks are "Raise Your Hands," "Can You Feel It?," and "Conway"." Caroline Sullivan from The Guardian wrote, "The first single by this handbag-techno crew, "I Like to Move It", lingered in the chart for 20 weeks. This album doesn't quite match its growly catchiness, but it's a respectable enough debut. The mood is upful, and singer The Mad Stuntman is equally proficient on ragga tracks like "The Stuntman's Theme" and Eurodisco affairs such as "Conway". But partner Erick Morillo makes only the expected noises on his keyboards, and when will we see an end to cliches like 'Respect in every aspect?'" Music & Media commented, "Scientists couldn't invent it, but these New Yorkers headed by the Mad Stuntman could: the pocket-size jukebox. It contains the hits "I Like to Move It", "Go On Move" and "Can You Feel It" plus the future chart-busters, all made according the same "Euro-goes-ragga" concept, with "The Stuntman's Anthem" being the purest reggae effort of the lot. As such it's vaguely reminiscent of Double Trouble & The Rebel MC's 1989 hit "Street Tough"."

Track listing
All tracks are produced by Erick Morillo with co-producers Keith Litman, Ralphie Muniz, and Peter Tulloch, featuring vocals by Althea McQueen and Mark Quashie.

Personnel
 Keith Litman – producer (tracks 1, 3 and 6)
 Peter Tulloch – producer (tracks 4, 5 and 9)
 Ralphie Muniz – producer (tracks 1 and 11)
 Campagna, New York – design
 Jose Nunez – engineer
 Donovan G. McKitty (tracks 4, 8 and 12)
 Mark Humphrey – photography (2)
 Erick Morillo – producer
 Althea McQueen – vocals (tracks 2, 10 and 12)

Charts

References

Reel 2 Real albums
1994 debut albums